FK Raštak is a football club based in the village of Raštak near Skopje, North Macedonia. They currently play in the Macedonian Third League (North Division).

History
The club was founded in 1959.

References

External links
Club info at MacedonianFootball 
Football Federation of Macedonia 

Raštak
Association football clubs established in 1959
1959 establishments in the Socialist Republic of Macedonia